For Your Consideration may refer to:

For Your Consideration (advertising), a heading frequently used in advertisements in entertainment trade publications
For Your Consideration (album), a 2008 comedy album by Kathy Griffin
For Your Consideration (film), a 2006 comedy film directed by Christopher Guest
For Your Consideration, a 2009 album by Taylor Mitchell